The County of Pembroke War Memorial (Welsh: Cofeb Ryfel Sir Benfro) is a county war memorial in Pembrokeshire, Wales. It was erected in 1921 in Pembrokeshire's county town, Haverfordwest, to commemorate the county's fallen of World War I. It is a Grade II listed structure.

Planning
Originally, the local authority's intention, having established a public fund to build a memorial hospital in Haverfordwest, was to use money left over to place plaques in the town to remember those killed in the war. As the administrative centre for the county, Haverfordwest was believed to be the appropriate place for this. However, there were calls, led by local MP Sir Ivor Philipps and other public and political figures, for a more substantial memorial. While funding continued and professional advice was sought, a design and location was decided upon. The War Memorial Committee finalised the design and materials in August 1920.

Design and construction
The memorial is a plinth on which rests a square column, topped by a seated dragon with folded wings. It was designed by the architects Oswald Milne and Paul Phipps, and the sculptor was W. R. Morgan. The memorial was constructed of Forest of Dean stone with bronze plaques and built by Haverfordwest masons T. Morgan & Son.

The memorial plaque to the front bears the arms of the county and has the following inscription:

Listed on each of the other three sides are four columns of approximately 100 names, ordered by regiment or unit. The Imperial War Museum's website lists some. The words SACRIFICE, HONOUR, VICTORY and COURAGE appear above the plaques; on each of the four chamfered corners are listed eleven battle honours.

The unveiling, on 3 September 1921, was performed by Private Hubert William ("Stokey") Lewis V.C. of the 11th Welsh, and was attended by dignitaries and large crowds.

When new roads were constructed in the 1970s, the memorial was moved to its present location in Picton Place, close by the former Masonic Hall. The structure was Grade II listed in 2005 "...as a particularly fine piece of early C20 sculpture and for historical interest as the county war memorial", and the Royal Commission on Monuments placed the record of the memorial online in 2013.

See also
List of public art in Haverfordwest

References

External links

World War I memorials in Wales
Grade II listed buildings in Pembrokeshire
Grade II listed monuments and memorials
Buildings and structures completed in 1921